is a Japanese voice actress, singer and model. She is associated with Stay Luck. She played Hanayo Koizumi in the idol group μ's (pronounced "Muse"), which is part of the Love Live! franchise. Her nickname is Shikaco.

Career
In 2002, Kubo won the 6th Nicora Model Audition Grand Prix. She signed with LesPros Entertainment shortly after that, and worked as a fashion model. While at LesPros, she shared a room with Ami Kikuchi.

In 2008 she moved to Sparks Productions and worked as a gravure model under the name Yurika Narahara.

Kubo moved to JMO Productions in 2010. She started voice acting while working as a gravure model for JMO, and started obtaining voice acting roles in 2012. She left JMO in 2012, and started working with Clare Voice in 2015.

In early 2015 μ's, the idol group that Kubo performed with as "Hanayo Koizumi", won the 9th Annual Seiyū Award. At the end of the year they performed at the 66th NHK Kōhaku Uta Gassen. The group went on hiatus after their final concert on 31 March and 1 April 2016, at the Tokyo Dome.

On 25 December 2015, Kubo debuted as a solo artist and released her first single, "Lovely Lovely Strawberry" a few months later on 17 February 2016. She released her first full album on 10 May 2017.

Kubo's contract with Clare Voice ended on 31 December 2017, and she began freelancing. Her fan club "SHiKAKO PARK", stopped taking new members on 1 January 2018, and shut down later that year on 31 May.

On 1 October 2019, it was announced that Kubo would be joining Stay Luck as her new agency.

Filmography

TV anime

Theatrical animation

ONA

OVA

Video games

Dubbing roles
 All of Us Are Dead, Lee Na-yeon (Lee Yoo-mi)
 Squid Game, Ji-yeong (240) (Lee Yoo-mi)
 Stalker's Prey, Laura Wilcox (Saxon Sharbino)

Discography

Single

Album

References

External links
 
Stay Luck profile

 (Staff)

1989 births
Living people
Anime singers
Japanese women pop singers
Japanese video game actresses
Japanese voice actresses
Μ's members
Models from Nara Prefecture
Musicians from Nara Prefecture
Voice actresses from Nara Prefecture
21st-century Japanese actresses
21st-century Japanese singers
21st-century Japanese women singers